Demetria "Metring" David (June 20, 1920 – October 7, 2010) was a Filipina comedian, famous for her "big feet" as she was called by her colleagues.

Early life and later career
Born in 1920, she first appeared as a comedian in the dramas Malapit sa Diyos (Near to God), and Walang Hanggan, both under Lebran Pictures. In that same year she was included in the comedy film entitled Babaing Kalbo starring Eleanor Medina. She made films for other companies including LVN Pictures, Galawgaw, a Nida Blanca movie, Fremel Pictures and a small role in Sapagka't Mahal Kita (Because, I Love You) to name a few. In the years that followed, Metring David rose to popularity as a comedian in the 1960s a decade in which she made some three dozen films and many television appearances.

Return to television
Meltring's last TV appearance was Wish Ko Lang! on GMA Channel 7.

Death
She died on October 7, 2010 in Manila, Philippines.

Selected filmography
1953 - Malapit sa Diyos
1953 - Walang Hanggan
1953 - Babaing Kalbo
1954 - Galawgaw
1955 - Sapagka't Mahal Kita
1986 - Inday Inday sa Balitaw 
1988 - Rosa Mistica 
1988 - Bobo Cop 
1988 - Puso sa Puso 
1988 - One Two Bato, Three Four Bapor 
1988 - Magkano ang Iyong Dangal? 
1988 - Pik Pak Boom 
1992 - Mahirap Maging Pogi 
2000 - Kailangan Ko'y Ikaw

Television
Buhay Artista (ABS-CBN)
Tarangtang-tangtang (ABS-CBN)
Dance-O-Rama (TV5)
Gorio En His Jeepney (TV5)
Dancetime with Chito (GMA Network)
Eskwelahang Munti (GMA Network)
Principe Abante (GMA Network)
Wish Ko Lang! (GMA Network) - her last TV appearance

References

External links

1920 births
2010 deaths
20th-century Filipino actresses
Filipino women comedians
Filipino film actresses
Filipino television actresses